Fredlanella is a genus of beetles in the family Cerambycidae, containing the following species:

 Fredlanella cerussata (Lane, 1964)
 Fredlanella diringshofeni (Lane, 1972)

References

Anisocerini